This is the complete order of battle of Allied and German forces involved during Operation Market Garden.

Allied forces
US General Dwight D. Eisenhower was Supreme Commander of the Supreme Headquarters Allied Expeditionary Forces (SHAEF) and in that capacity was ultimately responsible for the planning and execution of the whole operation. British Air Chief Marshal Sir Arthur Tedder was his deputy, while Major General Walter Bedell Smith was chief of staff.

First Allied Airborne Army
Commanded by Lieutenant General Lewis H. Brereton, USAAF

British I Airborne Corps 
Lieutenant-General Frederick Browning; also deputy commander of the 1st Airborne Army

 1st Airborne Division, Major-General Roy Urquhart
 1st Parachute Brigade, Brigadier Gerald Lathbury
 1st Parachute Battalion, Lieutenant-Colonel David T. Dobie
 2nd Parachute Battalion, Lieutenant-Colonel John Frost
 3rd Parachute Battalion, Lieutenant-Colonel John A.C. Fitch
 4th Parachute Brigade, Brigadier John W. Hackett
 10th Parachute Battalion, Lieutenant-Colonel Kenneth B.I. Smyth
 11th Parachute Battalion, Lieutenant-Colonel George H. Lea
 156th Parachute Battalion, Lieutenant-Colonel Sir Richard de Bacquencourt Des Voeux
 1st Airlanding Brigade, Brigadier Philip Hicks
 1st Battalion Border Regiment, Lieutenant-Colonel Thomas Haddon
 2nd Battalion South Staffordshire Regiment, Lieutenant-Colonel W. Derek H. McCardie
 7th Battalion King's Own Scottish Borderers, Lieutenant-Colonel Robert Payton-Reid
 1st Airborne Reconnaissance Squadron, Major Charles Frederick Gough
 21st Independent Parachute Company (Pathfinders), Major Bernard Wilson
 1st Airborne Divisional Signals, Lieutenant-Colonel Thomas G.V. Stephenson
 1st (Airborne) Divisional Provost Company, Corps of Military Police, Captain William B. Gray
 89th (Parachute) Field Security Section, Intelligence Corps, Captain John Killick
 Royal Artillery, Lieutenant-Colonel R.G. Loder-Symonds
 1st Airlanding Light Regiment, Lieutenant-Colonel William F.K. Thompson
 1st Airlanding Anti-Tank Battery, Major William F. Arnold
 2nd Airlanding Anti-Tank Battery, Major A.F. Haynes
 1st Forward (Airborne) Observation Unit, Major Denys R. Wight-Boycott
 Royal Engineers, Lieutenant-Colonel E.C.W. Myers
 1st Parachute Field Squadron, Major Douglas C. Murray then Captain Eric Mackay
 4th Parachute Field Squadron, Major Aeneas Perkins
 9th Airborne Field Company, Major John C. Winchester
 261st (Airborne) Field Park Company, Lieutenant William H. Skinner
 Royal Army Service Corps, Lieutenant-Colonel M. St. John Packe
 250th (Airborne) Light Composite Company, Major D.G. Clarke
 Royal Army Ordnance Corps, Lieutenant-Colonel G.A. Mobbs
 1st (Airborne) Divisional Field Park, Major Cecil Cyril Chidgey
 Royal Electrical and Mechanical Engineers
 1st (Airborne) Divisional Workshops, Major Jack Carrick
 Royal Army Medical Corps, Colonel Graeme M. Warrack
 16th (Parachute) Field Ambulance, Royal Army Medical Corps, Lieutenant-Colonel E. Townsend
 133rd (Parachute) Field Ambulance, Royal Army Medical Corps, Lieutenant-Colonel W.C. Alford
 163rd Field Ambulance, Lieutenant-Colonel Martin E.M. Herford
 181st (Airlanding) Field Ambulance, Royal Army Medical Corps, Lieutenant-Colonel Arthur T. Marrable
 Glider Pilot Regiment, Lieutenant-Colonel George Chatterton
 No.1 Wing, Lieutenant-Colonel Iain Murray
 No.2 Wing, Lieutenant-Colonel John Place

 Polish 1st Independent Parachute Brigade, Brigadier-General Stanisław Sosabowski (arrived September 21st)
 1st Parachute Infantry Battalion, Lieutenant-Colonel M. Tonn
 2nd Parachute Infantry Battalion, Lieutenant-Colonel W. Ploszewski
 3rd Parachute Infantry Battalion, Major W. Sobocinski
 Light Artillery Battery, Major J. Bielecki
 Anti-Tank Battery, Capt. J. K. Wardzala
 Engineers Company, Captain B.B. Budziszewski
 Medical Company, Lieutenant J. Moździerz
 Signals Company, Lieutenant-Colonel. W. D. Tucker

 82nd Airborne Division, Brigadier General James M. Gavin
 504th Parachute Infantry Regiment, Colonel Reuben H. Tucker
 1st Battalion, 504th PIR, Lieutenant Colonel John T. Berry
 2nd Battalion, 504th PIR, Lieutenant Colonel Edward Willems
 3rd Battalion, 504th PIR, Lieutenant Colonel Julian Cook
 505th Parachute Infantry Regiment, Colonel William E. Ekman
 1st Battalion, 505th PIR, Major Talton Long
 2nd Battalion, 505th PIR, Lieutenant Colonel Benjamin Vandervoort
 3rd Battalion, 505th PIR, Major James, Lieutenant Colonel Ed Krause
 508th Parachute Infantry Regiment - Colonel Roy E. Lindquist
 1st Battalion, 508th PIR, Lieutenant Colonel Shields Warren
 2nd Battalion, 508th PIR, Lieutenant Colonel Thomas Shanley, Major Otho Holmes
 3rd Battalion, 508th PIR, Lieutenant Colonel Louis G. Mendez, Jr.
 325th Glider Infantry Regiment, Colonel Charles Billingslea (arrived September 23rd)
 1st Battalion, 325th GIR, Lieutenant Colonel R. Klemm Boyd, Lieutenant Colonel Teddy Sanford
 2nd Battalion, 325th GIR, Major Charles T. Major
 2nd Battalion, 401st GIR, Major Osmund A. Leahy
 Divisional Artillery, Colonel Francis A. March
 319th Glider Field Artillery Battalion, Lieutenant Colonel J. Carter Todd
 320th Glider Field Artillery Battalion, Lieutenant Colonel Paul Wright
 376th Parachute Field Artillery Battalion, Lieutenant Colonel Wilbur Griffith
 456th Parachute Field Artillery Battalion, Lieutenant Colonel Wagner d’Allessio
 80th Airborne Antiaircraft Battalion, Lieutenant Colonel Raymond Singleton
 307th Airborne Engineer Battalion, Lieutenant Colonel Edwin Bedell
 307th Airborne Medical Company, Major Jerry J. Belden
 82nd Airborne Signal Company, Lieutenant Colonel J. Mohrmann
 82nd Counter Intelligence Corps Detachment
 782nd Airborne Ordnance Maintenance Company
 407th Airborne Quartermaster Company

 101st Airborne Division, Major General Maxwell D. Taylor
 501st Parachute Infantry Regiment, Colonel Howard R. Johnson
 1st Battalion, 501st PIR, Lieutenant Colonel Harry W.O. Kinnard
 2nd Battalion, 501st PIR, Lieutenant Colonel Robert A. Ballard
 3rd Battalion, 501st PIR, Lieutenant Colonel Julian Ewell
 502nd Parachute Infantry Regiment, Lieutenant Colonel John H. Michaelis
 1st Battalion, 502nd PIR, Lieutenant Colonel Patrick F. Cassidy
 2nd Battalion, 502nd PIR, Lieutenant Colonel Steven A. Chapuis, Lieutenant Colonel Elbridge Chapman
 3rd Battalion, 502nd PIR, Lieutenant Colonel Robert G. Cole (KIA September 18th)
 506th Parachute Infantry Regiment, Colonel Robert F. Sink
 1st Battalion, 506th PIR, Lieutenant Colonel Robert Harwick, James L. LaPrade
 2nd Battalion, 506th PIR, Lieutenant Colonel Robert Strayer
 3rd Battalion, 506th PIR, Lieutenant Colonel Oliver M. Horton, Lloyd E. Patch
 327th Glider Infantry Regiment, Colonel Joseph H. Harper
 1st Battalion, 327th GIR, Lieutenant Colonel Hartford T. Sallee
 2nd Battalion, 327th GIR, Lieutenant Colonel Thomas J. Rouzie
 1st Battalion, 401st Glider Infantry Regiment, Lieutenant Colonel Roy C. Allen
 Divisional Artillery, Brigadier General Anthony McAuliffe
 321st Glider Field Artillery Battalion, Lieutenant Colonel Edward Carmichael
 377th Parachute Field Artillery Battalion, Lieutenant Colonel Harry Elkins
 907th Glider Field Artillery Battalion, Lieutenant Colonel Clarence Nelson
 81st Airborne Antiaircraft Battalion, Lieutenant Colonel X.B. Cox, Jr.
 326th Airborne Engineer Battalion, Lieutenant Colonel Hugh Mozley or John Pappas
 326th Airborne Medical Company, Major William E. Barfield
 101st Airborne Signal Company, Lieutenant Colonel Sidney S. Davis
 101st Counter Intelligence Corps Detachment
 801st Airborne Ordnance Maintenance Company, Lieutenant Colonel Roger W. Parkinson
 426th Airborne Quartermaster Company, Major Charles J. Rich

21st Army Group
Commanded by Field Marshal Sir Bernard L. Montgomery

British Second Army
Commanded by Lieutenant-General Miles Dempsey

VIII Corps
Lieutenant-General Richard O'Connor

 11th Armoured Division, Major-General G. P. B. Roberts
 29th Armored Brigade, Brigadier C. B. C. Harvey
 23rd Hussars
 2nd Fife and Forfar Yeomanry
 3rd Royal Tank Regiment, Lieutenant Colonel A.W. Brown (KIA 25 September 1944)
 8th Battalion, Rifle Brigade (Prince Consort's Own)
 159th Infantry Brigade, Brigadier J. B. Chucher
 1st Battalion, Herefordshire Regiment
 3rd Battalion, Monmouthshire Regiment, Lieutenant Colonel Hubert Gerald Orr (KIA 25 September 1944)
 4th Battalion, King's Shropshire Light Infantry, Lieutenant Colonel Max Robinson
 15th/19th The King's Royal Hussars
 2nd Company, Royal Northumberland Fusiliers
 Royal Artillery
 13th Regiment Royal Horse Artillery
 151st Field Regiment
 75th Anti-Tank Regiment
 58th Light AA Regiment
 Royal Engineers
 13th Field Squadron
 612th Field Squadron
 10th Bridging Troop
 147th Field Park Squadron
 Royal Army Service Corps
 29th Armoured Brigade Company
 159th Infantry Brigade Company
 Divisional Transport Company
 Royal Army Ordnance Corps
 Ordnance Field Park
 Royal Electrical and Mechanical Engineers
 29th Armoured Brigade Workshop
 159th Infantry Brigade Workshop
 Royal Army Medical Corps
 18th Light Field Ambulance
 179th Light Field Ambulance
 7th Field Dressing Station
 Field Hygiene Section
 Divisional Signals
 Divisional Provost Company
 Divisional Troops Company
 270th Forward Delivery Squadron, Royal Armoured Corps

 3rd Infantry Division, Major-General L. G. Whistler
 8th Infantry Brigade, Brigadier E. E. Cass
 1st Battalion, South Lancashire Regiment
 1st Battalion, Suffolk Regiment
 2nd Battalion, East Yorkshire Regiment
 9th Infantry Brigade, Brigadier G. D. Browne
 1st Battalion, King's Own Scottish Borderers
 2nd Battalion, Lancashire Regiment
 2nd Battalion, Royal Ulster Rifles
 185th Infantry Brigade, Brigadier Eric Bols
 1st Battalion, Royal Norfolk Regiment
 2nd Battalion, King's Shropshire Light Infantry
 2nd Battalion, Royal Warwickshire Regiment
 3rd Recce Regiment, Royal Northumberland Fusiliers
 2nd Battalion, Middlesex Regiment
 Royal Artillery
 131st Field Regiment
 181st Field Regiment, Lieutenant-Colonel R.B.W. Bethell, DSO
 190th Field Regiment
 97th Anti-Tank Regiment
 119th Light AA Regiment
 Royal Engineers
 246th Field Company
 253rd Field Company
 17th Field Company
 2nd Bridging Platoon
 15th Field Park Company
 Royal Army Service Corps
 23rd Field Company
 47th Field Company
 48th Field Company
 Royal Army Ordnance Corps
 3rd Ordnance Field Park
 Royal Electrical and Mechanical Engineers
 8th Infantry Brigade Workshop
 9th Infantry Brigade Workshop
 185th Infantry Brigade Workshop
 Royal Army Medical Corps
 8th Field Ambulance
 9th Field Ambulance
 223rd Field Ambulance
 10th Field Dressing Station
 11th Field Dressing Station
 3rd Divisional Provost Company
 172nd Divisional Company
 3rd Divisional Signals

 49th (West Riding) Infantry Division, Lieutenant-General Evelyn Barker (not committed to the fighting, did not arrive in area until 21 September 1944)
  4th Armoured Brigade - Brigadier R. M. P. Carver
 2nd Battalion, King's Royal Rifle Corps
 3rd/4th County of London Yeomanry
 44th Royal Tank Regiment
 4th Regiment Royal Horse Artillery, Royal Artillery
 Royal Scots Greys
 4th Regiment Royal Horse Artillery, RA
 5th Field Company, RASC
 4th Armoured Brigade Ordnance Field Park, RAOC
 4th Armoured Brigade Workshop, REME
 14th Light Field Ambulance, RAMC
 271st Forward Delivery Squadron, RAC

 1st Belgian Infantry Brigade, Colonel Jean-Baptiste Piron
 1st Belgian Independent Motorised Fighting Group, Major Wintergroen
 2nd Belgian Independent Motorised Fighting Group, Major R. Waterloos
 3rd Belgian Independent Motorised Fighting Group, Major L. Nowe
 1st Belgian Armoured Car Squadron, Major B.E.M. de Solliers de Moranville
 1st Belgian Engineer Field Company, Captain R. Smekens
 1st Belgian/Luxembourg Field Artillery Battery, Lieutenant-Colonel B. de Ridder
 Brigade Maintenance
 Brigade Signals
 Anti-Aircraft Section

XII Corps
Lieutenant-General Neil Ritchie

 7th Armoured Division Major-General G. L. Verney
 22nd Armoured Brigade, Brigadier H. T. B. Cracroft
 1st (Motor) Battalion, The Rifle Brigade
 1st Royal Tank Regiment
 5th Royal Inniskilling Dragoon Guards
 5th Royal Tank Regiment
 131st Infantry Brigade, Brigadier Ernest Cecil Pepper
 1/5 Battalion, Queen's Royal Regiment
 1/6 Battalion, Queen's Royal Regiment
 1/7 Battalion, Queen's Royal Regiment
 8th King's Royal Irish Hussars, Lieutenant Colonel Cuthbert Goulborn
 3rd Company, Royal Northumberland Fusiliers
 Royal Artillery
 3rd Regiment Royal Horse Artillery
 5th Regiment Royal Horse Artillery
 65th Anti-Tank Regiment
 15th Light AA Regiment
 Royal Engineers
 4th Field Squadron
 621st Field Squadron
 7th Bridging Troop
 143rd Field Park Squadron
 Royal Army Service Corps
 58th Armoured Brigade Company
 67th Infantry Brigade Company
 507th Transport Company
 Royal Army Ordnance Corps
 22nd Armoured Brigade Ordnance Field Park
 131st Infantry Brigade Ordnance Field Park
 Royal Electrical and Mechanical Engineers
 22nd Armoured Brigade Workshop
 131st Infantry Brigade Workshop
 Royal Army Medical Corps
 131st Field Ambulance
 2nd Light Field Ambulance
 29th Field Dressing Station
 70th Field Hygiene Section
 134th Mobile Dental Unit
 Divisional Signals
 Divisional Provost Company
 507th Divisional Troops Company
 263rd Forward Delivery Squadron, Royal Armoured Corps

 15th (Scottish) Infantry Division, Major-General C. M. Barber
 44th Infantry Brigade, Brigadier J. C. Cockburn
 6th Battalion, Royal Scots Fusiliers
 6th Kings Own Scottish Borderers
 8th Battalion, Royal Scots
 46th Infantry Brigade, Brigadier R. M. Villiers
 2nd Battalion, Glasgow Highlanders
 7th Battalion, Seaforth Highlanders
 9th Battalion, Cameronians
 227th Infantry Brigade, Brigadier E. C. Colville
 10th Battalion, Highland Light Infantry
 2nd Battalion, Argyll and Sutherland Highlanders
 2nd Battalion, Gordon Highlanders
 15th Recce Regiment, Lieutenant Colonel J.A. Grant-Peterkin, then on 23 September 1944 Lieutenant Colonel K.C.C. Smith
 1st Battalion, Middlesex Regiment
 Royal Artillery
 131st Field Regiment
 181st Field Regiment
 190th Field Regiment
 97th Anti-Tank Regiment
 119th Light AA Regiment
 Royal Engineers
 20th Field Company
 278th Field Company
 279th Field Company
 26th Bridging Platoon
 624th Field Park Company
 Royal Army Service Corps
 283rd Field Company
 284th Field Company
 399th Field Company
 Royal Army Ordnance Corps
 15th Ordnance Field Park
 Royal Electrical and Mechanical Engineers
 44th Infantry Brigade Workshop
 46th Infantry Brigade Workshop
 227th Infantry Brigade Workshop
 Royal Army Medical Corps
 153rd Field Ambulance
 193rd Field Ambulance
 194th Field Ambulance
 22nd Field Dressing Station
 23rd Field Dressing Station
 40th Field Hygiene Section
 15th Divisional Signals
 62nd Divisional Company
 15th Divisional Provost Company

 53rd (Welsh) Infantry Division - Major-General R. K. Ross
 71st Infantry Brigade, Brigadier V. Bromfield
 1st Battalion, Highland Light Infantry
 1st Battalion, Oxford and Bucks Light Infantry
 4th Battalion, Royal Welch Fusiliers
 158th Infantry Brigade, Brigadier G.O. Sugden
 1/5 Battalion, Welch Regiment
 1st Battalion, East Lancashire Regiment
 7th Battalion, Royal Welch Fusiliers
 160th Infantry Brigade, Brigadier C.F.C Coleman
 2nd Battalion, Monmouthshire Regiment
 4th Battalion, Welch Regiment
 6th Battalion, Royal Welch Fusiliers
 53rd Recce Regiment
 1st Battalion, Manchester Regiment
 Royal Artillery
 81st Field Regiment
 83rd Field Regiment
 133rd Field Regiment
 71st Anti-Tank Regiment
 116th Light AA Regiment
 Royal Engineers
 244th Field Company
 282nd Field Company
 555th Field Company
 22nd Bridging Platoon
 285th Field Park Company
 Royal Army Service Corps
 531st Field Company
 532nd Field Company
 533rd Field Company
 Royal Army Ordnance Corps
 53rd Ordnance Field Park
 Royal Electrical and Mechanical Engineers
 71st Infantry Brigade Workshop
 158th Infantry Brigade Workshop
 160th Infantry Brigade Workshop
 Royal Army Medical Corps
 147th Field Ambulance
 202nd Field Ambulance
 212th Field Ambulance
 13th Field Dressing Station
 26th Field Dressing Station
 53rd Field Hygiene Section
 53rd Divisional Signals
 501st Divisional Company
 43rd Divisional Provost Company

XXX Corps
Lieutenant-General Brian Horrocks

 Guards Armoured Division, Major-General A.H.S. Adair
 5th Guards Armoured Brigade, Brigadier Norman Gwatkin
 1st Armoured Battalion, Coldstream Guards
 2nd Armoured Battalion, Grenadier Guards
 2nd Armoured Battalion, Irish Guards, Lieutenant Colonel Giles Vandeleur
 1st Motorised Battalion, Grenadier Guards
 32nd Guards Brigade, Brigadier George Johnson
 1st Battalion, Welsh Guards
 5th Battalion, Coldstream Guards
 3rd Battalion, Irish Guards, Lieutenant Colonel J.O.E. Vandeleur
 2nd Household Cavalry Regiment, Lieutenant Colonel H. Abel Smith
 2nd Armoured Reconnaissance Battalion, Welsh Guards, Lieutenant Colonel J. C. Windsor-Lewis
 1st Independent Machine Gun Company (Royal Northumberland Fusiliers)
 No. 268th Forward Delivery Squadron, RAC
 77th Field Security Section
 Guards Armoured Divisional Signals, Royal Corps of Signals, Lieutenant Colonel W.D. Tucker
 Royal Artillery, Brigadier Herbert C. Phipps
 55th Field Regiment
 153rd Field Regiment
 21st Anti-Tank Regiment, Lieutenant Colonel R.C. Hulbert
 94th Light Anti-Aircraft Regiment
 Royal Engineers, Lieutenant Colonel, C.P. Jones
 14th Field Squadron
 615th Field Squadron
 148th Field Park Squadron
 11th Bridging Troop
 Royal Army Medical Corps, Colonel B.J. Daunt
 19th Light Field Ambulance, Lieutenant Colonel B.M. Nicol
 128th Field Ambulance, Lieutenant Colonel J.M. Scott
 8th Field Dressing Station
 60th Field Hygiene Section
 Royal Army Ordnance Corps, Lieutenant Colonel F.B.H. Villiers
 Guards Armoured Divisional Ordnance Field Park
 Royal Army Service Corps, Lieutenant Colonel A.K. Woods
 224th Infantry Brigade Company
 310th Armoured Brigade Company
 535th Divisional Troops Company
 648th General Transport Company
 Royal Electrical and Mechanical Engineers, Lieutenant Colonel L.H. Atkinson
 5th Guards Brigade Workshop
 32nd Guards Brigade Workshop

 43rd (Wessex) Infantry Division, Major-General Ivor Thomas
 129th Infantry Brigade, Brigadier G.H.L. Luce
 4th Battalion, Somerset Light Infantry, Lieutenant Colonel C.G. Lipscomb
 4th Battalion, Wiltshire Regiment, Lieutenant Colonel E.L. Luce
 5th Battalion, Wiltshire Regiment, Lieutenant W.G. Roberts
 130th Infantry Brigade, Brigadier B.B. Walton
 4th Battalion, Dorsetshire Regiment, Colonel Gerald Tilly
 5th Battalion, Dorsetshire Regiment, Lieutenant Colonel B.A. Coad
 7th Battalion, Hampshire Regiment, Lieutenant Colonel D.E.B. Talbot
 214th Infantry Brigade Brigadier Hubert Essame
 1st Battalion, Worcestershire Regiment, Lieutenant Colonel R.E. Osborne-Smith
 5th Battalion, Duke of Cornwall's Light Infantry, Lieutenant Colonel George Taylor
 7th Battalion, Somerset Light Infantry, Lieutenant Colonel R.E. Osborne-Smith
 43rd Reconnaissance Regiment, Lieutenant Colonel Francis Lane Fox
 8th Battalion, Middlesex Regiment (Machine Guns)
 43rd Divisional Signals
 506th Divisional Company
 Royal Artillery
 94th Field Regiment
 112th Field Regiment
 179th Field Regiment
 59th Anti-Tank Regiment
 110th Light Anti-Aircraft Regiment
 Royal Engineers
 204th Field Company
 260th Field Company
 553rd Field Company
 207th Field Park Company
 13th Bridging Platoon
 Royal Army Service Corps
 204th Field Company
 260th Field Company
 553rd Field Company
 Royal Electrical and Mechanical Engineers
 129th Infantry Brigade Workshop
 130th Infantry Brigade Workshop
 214th Infantry Brigade Workshop
 Royal Army Medical Corps
 129th Field Ambulance
 130th Field Ambulance
 213th Field Ambulance
 14th Field Dressing Station
 15th Field Dressing Station
 38th Field Dressing Station

 50th (Northumbrian) Infantry Division, Major-General D. A. H. Graham; On 18 September the division was transferred to VIII Corps
 69th Infantry Brigade, Brigadier F. Y. C. Cox
 5th Battalion, East Yorkshire Regiment
 6th Battalion, Green Howards
 7th Battalion, Green Howards
 151st Infantry Brigade, Brigadier D. S. Gordon
 6th Battalion, Durham Light Infantry
 8th Battalion, Durham Light Infantry
 9th Battalion, Durham Light Infantry
 231st Infantry Brigade Brigadier Sir Alexander Stanier
 1st Battalion, Dorsetshire Regiment
 1st Battalion, Hampshire Regiment
 7th Battalion, Devonshire Regiment
 61st Recce Regiment
 2nd Battalion, Cheshire Regiment (Machine Gun)
 Royal Artillery
 74th Field Regiment
 90th Field Regiment
 124th Field Regiment
 102nd Anti-Tank Regiment
 25th Light Anti-Aircraft Regiment
 Royal Engineers
 235th Field Company
 295th Field Company
 505th Field Company
 13th Bridging Platoon
 233rd Field Park Company
 Royal Army Service Corps
 346th Field Company
 508th Field Company
 522nd Field Company
 Royal Electrical and Mechanical Engineers
 69th Infantry Brigade Workshop
 151st Infantry Brigade Workshop
 231st Infantry Brigade Workshop
 Royal Army Medical Corps
 149th Field Ambulance
 186th Field Ambulance
 200th Field Ambulance
 47th Field Dressing Station
 48th Field Dressing Station
 22nd Field Hygiene Station
 524th Divisional Company
 50th Divisional Signals
 19 Field Security Section, Intelligence Corps

 8th Armoured Brigade, Brigadier George E. Prior-Palmer
 4th/7th Dragoon Guards
 13th/18th Hussars
 Sherwood Rangers Yeomanry
 12th (Queen's Westminsters) Battalion, King's Royal Rifle Corps
 147th Field Regiment, Royal Artillery
 552nd Field Company, Royal Army Service Corps
 8th Armoured Brigade Workshop, Royal Electrical and Mechanical Engineers
 168th Light Field Ambulance, Royal Army Medical Corps

 Royal Netherlands Brigade 'Prinses Irene', Colonel A. de Ruyter van Steveninck
 1st Netherlands Independence Motorised Fighting Group, Major Paessens
 2nd Netherlands Independence Motorised Fighting Group, Major Molenaar
 3rd Netherlands Independence Motorised Fighting Group, Major Huber
 1st Netherlands Reconnaissance Squadron, Captain Immink
 1st Netherlands Field Artillery Battery

Air forces

Royal Air Force
 Second Tactical Air Force - Air Marshal Sir Arthur Coningham
 No. 83 Group RAF - Air Vice-Marshal H. Broadhurst
 RCAF 39 Reconnaissance Wing
 121, 122, 123, 143 Wings (Typhoon)
 125 Wing (Spitfire)
 RCAF 126, 127 Wings (Spitfire)
 No. 2 Group RAF - Air Vice-Marshal B. E. Embry
 136, 138, 140 Wings (Mosquito)
 137, 139 Wings (B-25 Mitchell)
 No. 84 Group RAF - Air Vice Marshal Leslie Brown

Fighter Command - Air Marshal Roderick Hill

Bomber Command - Air Chief Marshal Sir Arthur Harris

RAF Coastal Command - Air Chief Marshal Sholto Douglas

United States Army Air Forces
 U.S. Eighth Air Force - Lieutenant General James H. Doolittle

 U.S. Ninth Air Force - Lieutenant General Hoyt S. Vandenberg

German forces
The majority of German units stationed west of the Rhine were under the responsibility of Oberbefehlshaber West (OB West), commanded at the time by Generalfeldmarschall Gerd von Rundstedt. Due to a lack of replacements (both in terms of personnel and materiel) German units were generally severely understrength at this point in the war, with many units at about 50% of establishment strength.

Army Group B
Generalfeldmarschall Walther Model

German Armed Forces Group (AFC) Netherlands
General der Flieger Friedrich Christiansen

Seventh Army
General der Panzertruppe Erich Brandenberger

I. SS Panzerkorps
 1st SS Panzer Division “Leibstandarte SS Adolf Hitler” (remnants)
 12th SS Panzer Division “Hitler Jugend” (remnants)
 Kampfgruppe 2. SS-Panzer-Division “Das Reich” + Kampfgruppe 2. Panzer-Division
 Kampfgruppe Division Nr. 172

LXXXI. Armeekorps
 183rd Volksgrenadier Division
 49. Infanterie-Division (remnants)
 246th Volksgrenadier Division
 12. Infanterie-Division
 275. Infanterie-Division

LXXIV. Armeekorps
 353. Infanterie-Division
 Kampfgruppe 347. Infanterie-Division
 89. Infanterie-Division
 348. Infanterie-Division (remnants)

LXXX. Armeekorps
 Kampfgruppe Hauser (Panzer-Lehr-Division (part))
 36th Grenadier Division
 Kampfgruppe 5. Fallschirmjäger-Division

1. Fallschirm-Armee
Colonel General Kurt Student

II. SS-Panzerkorps
SS-Obergruppenführer Wilhelm Bittrich

 9. SS-Panzergrenadier-Division Hohenstaufen,
SS-Standartenführer Walter Harzer
 SS-Panzer Regiment 9
 Abteilung I
 Abteilung II
 SS-Panzergrenadier Regiment 19
 Bataillon I
 SS-Panzergrenadier Regiment 20
 Bataillon I
 Bataillon II
 SS-Panzer Artillerie Regiment 9
 Abteilung I, SS-Obersturmbannfuhrer Ludwig Spindler
 SS-Panzer-Aufklärung-Abteilung 9, Hauptsturmführer Viktor Eberhard Gräbner
 SS-Panzerjäger-Abteilung 9, Hauptsturmfürer Klaus von Allworden
 SS-Panzer-Pionier-Abteilung 9, SS-Hauptsturmführer Hans Möller
 SS-FlaK-Abteilung 9, Obersturmfürer Gropp
 SS Pionier Lehr Abteilung 9
 SS-Feldgendarmerie-Trupp 9
 SS-Panzer-Nachrichten-Abteilung 9
 SS-Sturmgeschütz-Abteilung 9
 SS-Beobachtungs-Batterie 9
 SS-Nachschubtruppen 9
 SS-Panzer-Instandsetzungs-Abteilung 9
 SS-Wirtschafts-Battalion 9
 SS-Verwaltungstruppen-Abteilung 9
 SS-Sanitäts-Kompanien 9
 SS-Feldlazarett
 SS-Krankenkraftwagenzug 9
 SS-Feldpostamt 9
 SS-Kriegsberichter-Zug 9
 SS-Feldersatz-Battalion 9
 SS-Ausbildungs-Battalion 9

 10. SS-Panzer-Division Frundsberg,
SS-Gruppenführer Heinz Harmel
 SS-Panzer-Regiment 10, SS-Oberstürmbannführer Otto Paetsch
 Abteilung I
 Abteilung II
 SS-Panzergrenadier-Regiment 21, SS-Sturmbannführer Heinz Laubscheer
 Bataillon I
 SS-Panzergrenadier-Regiment 22, SS-Sturmbannführer Wilhelm Schulze
 Bataillon I
 Bataillon II
 SS-Panzer-Artillerie-Regiment 10, SS-Sturmbannführer Hans-George Sonnenstuhl
 Bataillon I
 Bataillon II
 Bataillon III
 SS-Aufklärungs Battalion 10, SS-Sturmbannführer Heinrich Brinkmann
 SS-Panzerjäger-Abteilung 10, SS-Sturmbannfuhrer Leo-Hermann Reinhold
 SS-Pionier-Abteilung 10, SS-Sturmbannführer Tröbinger
 SS-FlaK-Abteilung 10, SS-Sturmbannführer Rudolf Schrembs
 SS-Nachrichten Battalion 10, SS-Sturmbannführer Willi Kruft
 SS-Kradschützen-Regiment 10
 SS-Sturmgeschütz-Abteilung 10
 SS-Panzer-Nachrichten-Abteilung 10
 SS-Verwaltungs Truppen 10
 SS-Instandsetzungs Abteilung 10
 SS-Sanitäts-Abteilung 10
 SS-Nachschub Truppen 10
 SS-Feldpostamt 10
 SS-Kriegsberichter-Zug 10
 SS-Feldgendarmerie-Trupp 10

6th Parachute Regiment, Oberstleutnant Friedrich August Freiherr von der Heydte
 Bataillon I, Hauptmann Emil Priekschat
 Bataillon II, Hauptmann Rolf Mager
 Bataillon III, Hauptmann Horst Trebes
 Pionier Kompanie
 Panzerjäger Kompanie
 Fusilier Kompanie

Kampfgruppe "Von Tettau", Generalleutnant Hans von Tettau
 SS Unterführerschule Arnheim, SS-Standartenführer Michael Lippert
 Bataillon I
 Bataillon II
 Bataillon III
 SS Polizei Schule
 SS Training and Replacement Battalion 4, Leutnant Labahn
 Battalion 1, SS-Haüptstürmführer Günther Schulz
 Battalion 2, SS-Sturmbannführer Eugen Eberwein
 SS Wach Battalion 3, SS-Sturmbannführer Paul Anton Helle
 Schiffsturm Abteilung 10, Kapitan Leutnant Zaubzer
 Schiffsturm Abteilung 6/14
 Fliegerhorst Battalion 2
 Fliegerhorst Battalion 3
 Artillerie Regiment 184
 Sicherheit Regiment 42

Kampfgruppe "Knoche", Major Knoche
 Sicherheit Regiment 26
 Bataillon I
 Bataillon II
 MG Bataillon 30
 FlaK Abteilung 688
 Bataillon I
 Bataillon II
 Hermann Göering Schule Regiment, Oberst Waldemar Kluge
 Hermann Göering Schule Regiment
 Bataillon I
 Panzer Abteilung 224
 SS Ersatz Abteilung 4
 Deelen Airfield FlaK Kompanie
 Wach Kompanie
 Reichs AD

Kampfgruppe "Kraft", SS-Sturmbannführer Sepp Kraft
 SS Panzergrendier Bataillon 16

Schwerepanzer Abteilung 506, Major Eberhard Lange

Schwerepanzer Kompanie Hummel

StuG Abteilung 280????

Artillerie Regiment 191
 Bataillon I
 Bataillon II
 Bataillon III
 SS-Werfer Abteilung 102, Hauptsturmfürer Nickmann

Kampfgruppe "Brinkmann"

Kampfgruppe "Bruhn"

Kampfgruppe "Harder"

Sperrverband "Harzer", Gerhard
 MG Bataillon 47
 Marine Kampfgruppe 642
 Kampfgruppe "Schörken"
 Kampfgruppe "Kauer"
 SS Abteilung "Landstrum Nederland"

Kampfgruppe "Knaust", Major Knaust
 Ersatz Abteilung Bocholt
 Panzer Kompanie "Mielke"

Kampfgruppe "Spindler"

FlaK Abteilung "Swoboda"

Kampfgruppe "von Allworden", Captain Klaus von Allworden

Kampfgruppe "Weber"
 Nachrichten Abteilung 213

Sösterberg Fliegerhorst Battalion?

Kampfgruppe "Henke", A Fallschirmjager training Regiment under the command of Oberst Fritz Henke?

II. Fallschirm-Korps
General der Fallschirmtruppen Eugen Meindl
 3rd Fallschirmjäger Division, Generalmajor Walter Wadehn
 Fallschirmjäger-Regiment 5, Major H. Müller
 Bataillon I
 Fallschirmjäger-Regiment 8, Oberstleutnant Ernst Liebach
 Bataillon I
 Fallschirmjäger-Regiment 9, Oberst Hellmut Hoffmann
 Bataillon I
 Fallschirm-Artillerie-Regiment 3
 Bataillon I
 Bataillon II
 Bataillon III
 3rd Fallschirmjäger Aufklärungs Battalion
 Abteilung Isphording
 Fallschirm-Flak-Abteilung 3
 Fallschirm-Panzerjäger-Abteilung 3
 Fallschirm-Pionier-Bataillon 3, Major Karl-Heinz Beth
 6th Fallschirmjäger Division, Oberst Harry Hermann
 6th Fallschirm-Artillerie Regiment, Oberst Winkler or Major Walter-Otto Franke?
 Fallschirm-Flak-Abteilung 6
 Fallschirmjäger-Regiment 17, Oberst Martin Vetter?
 Fallschirmjäger-Regiment 18, Oberst Erich Walther
 Fallschirm-Panzerjäger-Abteilung 6
 Fallschirm-Pionier-Bataillon 6, Major Stipschitz
 5th Fallschirmjäger Division, Generalmajor Sebastian-Ludwig Heilmann
 Fallschirm-Jäger-Regiment 13, Hauptmann Plodder or Oberstleutnant Achim Fehse?
 Bataillon I
 Bataillon II
 Bataillon III
 Fallschirm-Artillerie-Regiment 5, Oberst Winzer
 Fallschirm-Flak-Abteilung 5
 Fallschirm-Jäger-Regiment 14, Oberst Arno Schimmel?
 Fallschirm-Jäger-Regiment 15, Oberst Kurt Gröschke?
 Fallschirm-Panzerjäger-Abteilung 5?
 Fallschirm-Pionier-Bataillon 5, Major Gerhard Mertins?
 Kampfgruppe "Greshick"
 Bataillon I
 Bataillon II
 Bataillon III
 Fallschirmjäger FlaK

XII. SS-Armeekorps
SS-Obergruppenführer Curt von Gottberg
 180th Infantry Division, Generalmajor Bernhard Klosterkemper
 Grenadier Regiment 1221
 Bataillon I
 Bataillon II
 Grenadier Regiment 1222
 Bataillon I
 Bataillon II
 Grenadier Regiment 1223
 Bataillon I
 Bataillon II
 Fusilier Abteilung 180
 Artillerie Regiment 880
 Bataillon I
 Bataillon II
 Bataillon III
 Panzerjäger Kompanie 1180
 1180th Pionier Battalion?
 190th Infantry Division, Generalleutnant Ernst Hammer
 Grenadier Regiment 1224
 Grenadier Regiment 1225
 Grenadier Regiment 1226
 Fusilier Battalion 190
 Artillerie Regiment 890
 Abteilung I
 Abteilung II
 Abteilung III
 Panzerjäger Abteilung 1190
 Pionier Bataillon 1190
 Nachrichten Bataillon 1190
 363rd Volkgrenadier Division, Generalleutnant Augustus Dettling
 Grenadier Regiment 957
 Bataillon I
 Bataillon II
 Grenadier Regiment 958
 Bataillon I
 Bataillon II
 Grenadier Regiment 959
 Bataillon I
 Bataillon II
 Fusilier Kompanie 363
 Artillerie Regiment 363
 Bataillon I
 Bataillon II
 Bataillon III
 Bataillon IV
 363rd Panzerjäger Battalion?
 363rd Pionier Battalion?
 Kampfgruppe Klauck?

LXXXVI Corps
General der Infanterie Hans von Obstfelder
 176th Infantry Division, Oberst Christian-Johannes Landau
 1176th Panzerjäger Battalion
 1176th Pionier Battalion
 176th Fusilier Battalion
 Kampfgruppe "Walther"
 Fallschirmjäger Regiment von Hoffmann
 Bataillon I
 Bataillon II
 FlaK
 Panzerjäger Kompanie
 Luftwaffe Ersatz Abteilung
 Schwere Panzerjäger-Abteilung 559
 107th Panzer Brigade, Major Berndt-Joachim Freiherr von Maltzahn
 Panzer Abteilung 2107,  Major Hans-Albrecht von Plüskow (KIA September 22nd)
 Panzergrenadier Regiment 2107, Hauptmann Kurt Wild (KIA September 23rd)
 Flakzug 2107
 Panzerjäger Kompanie 2107
 Panzer Pionier Kompanie 2107
 Division "Erdmann", Generalleutnant Wolfgang Erdmann (Transferred to 1st Fallschirmarmee September 4th)
 Fallschirmjäger Regiment "Grossmehl", Oberstleutnant Grossmehl
 Fallschirmjäger Regiment "Hübner"
 Fallschirmjäger Regiment "Laytved-Hardegg", Oberst Laytved-Hardegg
 Fallschirmjäger Regiment "Menzel", Oberst Günther Menzel
 Fallschirm-Jäger-Ersatz- und Ausbildungs-Regiment Greve
 Fallschirm-Panzer-Jäger-Abteilung Grunwald
 Bataillon Schäfer
 Bataillon Schluckebier
 Kampfgruppe "Heinke"
 SS Panzergrenadier Regiment 19, Bataillon II
 SS Panzergrenadier Regiment 21, Bataillon II
 SS Panzerjäger Abteilung 10
 SS Artillerie 9, Bataillon I
 SS Artillerie 10, Bataillon I
 Kampfgruppe SS FlaK Bataillon 10

Fifteenth Army
General der Infanterie Gustav-Adolf von Zangen

LXXXIX. Armeekorps
 64. Infanterie-Division
 70. Infanterie-Division

LXVII. Armeekorps
General der Infanterie Otto Sponheimer

346. Infanterie-Division, Generalleutnant Erich Diestel
 Grenadier-Regiment 857
 Grenadier-Regiment 858
 Grenadier-Regiment 1018
 Füsilier-Bataillon 346
 Artillerie-Regiment 346, Hauptmann Karl-Heinz Vahrenhorst
 Pionier-Bataillon 346
 Panzerjäger-Abteilung 346
 Nachrichten-Abteilung 346
 Feldersatz-Bataillon 346
 Versorgungseinheiten 346

 711. Infanterie-Division, Generalleutnant Josef Reichert
 Grenadier-Regiment 731
 Grenadier-Regiment 744
 Grenadier-Regiment 763
 Füsilier-Bataillon 1711
 Artillerie-Regiment 1711, Oberstleutnant Hermann Freiherr von Ebner
 Pionier-Bataillon 711
 Panzerjäger-Abteilung 711
 Nachrichten-Abteilung 711
 Feldersatz-Bataillon 1711
 Versorgungseinheiten 711

 719. Infanterie-Division, Generalleutnant Karl Sievers - Transferred to 1st Fallschirmarmee September 4.
 Artillerie Regiment 1719
 Bataillon I
 Bataillon II
 Pionier Battalion 719, Major der Reserve Theodor Fleischhut
 Grenadier Regiment 723, Oberst Vehrenkamp
 Bataillon I
 Bataillon II
 Bataillon III
 Grenadier Regiment 743, Oberst Bosselman
 Bataillon I
 Bataillon II
 Bataillon III
 Panzerjäger-Abteilung 719
 Nachrichten-Abteilung 719
 Feldersatz-Bataillon 719
 Versorgungseinheiten 719

LXXXVIII. Armeekorps
General der Infanterie Hans-Wolfgang Reinhard

 59th Infantry Division, Generalleutnant Walter Poppe
 Grenadier Regiment 1034
 Bataillon I
 Bataillon II
 Grenadier Regiment 1035
 Bataillon I
 Bataillon II
 Grenadier Regiment 1036
 Bataillon I
 Bataillon II
 Artillerie Regiment 159
 Bataillon I
 Bataillon II
 Bataillon III
 Panzerjäger Abteilung 59
 Pionier Abteilung 59
 Fallschirmjäger-Regiment "Jungwirth"
Kampfgruppe "Rink"
 Bataillon I
 Polizei
 FlaK
Kampfgruppe "Ewald"
 Marsch Bataillon Zedlitz
245. Infanterie-Division, Generalleutnant Erwin Sande
 Infanterie Regiment 935
 Infanterie Regiment 936
 Infanterie Regiment 937
 245th Artillerie Regiment
 Bataillon I
 Bataillon II
 Bataillon III
 Fusilier Bataillon 245
 Feldersatz Bataillon 245
 Pionier Bataillon 245
 Signals Bataillon 245?
 Supply Troops?

 712. Infanterie-Division, Generalleutnant Friedrich-Wilhelm Neumann
 Grenadier Regiment 732
 Grenadier Regiment 745
 652nd Artillerie Battalion
 Bataillon I
 Bataillon II
 Panzerjäger Kompanie 712
 Pionier Bataillon 712
 Nachrichten Abteilung 712
 Supply Troops 712?
 1712th Artillerie Battalion, Hauptmann Wilhelm Kratzer?

Kampfgruppe "Chill", Generalleutnant Kurt Chill
 Fallschirmjäger Regiment 2
 Bataillon I
 Grenadier Regiment 1053
 Bataillon I
 Bataillon II
 Grenadier Regiment 1054
 Bataillon I
 Bataillon II
 Artillerie Regiment 158
 Bataillon I
 Bataillon II
 Panzerjäger Abteilung 85

FlaK Brigade 18

Wehrkreis VI, Corps "Feldt"
General der Kavalerie Kurt Feldt

406. Landesschützen Division, Generalleutnant Gerd Scherbening
 172nd Landesschützen Regiment?
 183rd Landesschützen Regiment?
 33rd Landesschützen Regiment?
 6th Replacement and Training Battalion?
 Unteroffizier Schule Wehrkreis 6
 Unteroffizier Schule Jülich
 Unteroffizier Schule Düren
 Scharfschütze Schule 6
 Landsschützen Abteilung I./6
 Landsschützen Abeilung II./6
 Landsschützen Abteilung III./6
 3 Kompanie / 406 Ersatz Abteilung
 Landsschützen Abteilung B
 Landsschützen Abteilung 254
 Artillerie Abteilung 406
 Kampfgruppe Tiltma

Ersatz Abteilung 6

Magen Abteilung

Ohr Abteilung

See also

 List of orders of battle

References and notes

Further reading
 Stephen Badsey, Arnhem 1944: Operation 'Market Garden. Osprey Publishing, Ltd. 1998. 
 Cornelius Ryan, A Bridge Too Far. Simon and Schuster, 1974.

External links
 Royal Engineers Museum The Royal Engineers and Operation Market Garden

World War II orders of battle
Operation Market Garden